The Bone Orchard Mythos is a 2022 comicbook series by writer Jeff Lemire and artist Andrea Sorrentino, published by Image Comics. It is designed to be a shared universe of self-contained horror stories told in various formats.

Publication history
Early on, even before The Bone Orchard Mythos was announced, Jeff Lemire described the project as "the most ambitious thing [Andrea Sorrentino] and I have done together." During their first creator-owned work together, Gideon Falls, Lemire discovered that despite the complexity of the project, he and Sorrentino bounced ideas off of each other in a way that felt effortless, which made him feel like they could tackle a project even more challenging. The idea for The Bone Orchard Mythos sprang from Sorrentino, who wanted to darker stories, but expansive like H. P. Lovecraft's Cthulhu Mythos; individual stand-alone stories which share a common mythology. Sorrentino also wanted to do different formats, miniseries, maxiseries, original graphic novels, and more. He described the series as "the kind of stories I want to read as a graphic novel and comics fan, and the kind of things I want to draw as an artist." Part of the appeal of doing different stories was that it opened up more opportunities to experiment with his style and stay fresh.

It was essential to both creators though that any story could act as an entry point to the series, that they could be read in any order and still make sense. The connections between the books are an additional feature for more dedicated readers. Over a period of a year before the series was announced, Lemire and Sorrentino worked out the whole story, plotted out in chronological order. However, they do not plan to ever tell the full story, but rather show "enough" of the story that readers get a sense of it, told non-chronologically through the various stand-alone stories. It is designed to be interpreted. This approach was inspired by the work of David Lynch.

The series was announced with a teaser trailer on Halloween 2021 with further details emerging over the following week from the social media channels of Lemire, Sorrentino, and Image Comics. Three titles were revealed in the initial announcement (The Passageway, Ten Thousand Black Feathers, and Tenement) along with promise of more in 2023 and beyond.

Prelude: Shadow Eater
Originally published as a one-shot story for Free Comic Book Day (FCBD) 2022, Shadow Eater was designed to be "an appetizer for the horror to come." While the FCBD issue was mentioned as part of the original announcement, no details, not even a title, were revealed until Lemire teased his newsletter readers with the comic's cover a month ahead of the FCBD 2022 titles reveal announcement.

The Passageway
The first major story in the series was The Passageway, an original graphic novel scheduled for release June 15, 2022. Originally a different story was meant to be the first, but when Lemire couldn't get that story to work, he came up with the idea for The Passageway and wrote the script in a week. For Lemire, it was essential that the story be character-driven, rather than driven by its concept. Sorrentino felt The Passageway was the right story to establish The Bone Orchard Mythos  since it was about the "passageway" to supernatural horrors of their universe, both for readers and the characters in the story.

Ten Thousand Black Feathers
Ten Thousand Black Feathers is a 5-issue miniseries scheduled for a monthly release beginning September 2022.

Tenement
Tenement was the last of the three titles revealed in the original announcement. Though it was at first slated to be an original graphic novel, it had become a six-issue miniseries by the time Starseed was announced, and later it was further expanded to ten issues with a double-length first issue. This was so readers could spend time with the seven leads and invest in their stories. Tenement #1 is currently scheduled for a June 21, 2023 release.

When Lemire and Sorrentino were originally discussing possible stories to act as the reader's introduction to The Bone Orchard Mythos, Tenement was their first choice before later settling on The Passageway. It was the first story that Lemire began working on and meant to be a centerpiece for all the stories to date, connecting threads from previous stories while expanding the larger mythology.

Starseed
For Halloween 2022, Lemire announced Starseed in his newsletter. The story is scheduled for release at the end of 2023.

Reception

Critical reception

The Passageway
Critics generally praised the debut OGN, especially Andrea Sorrentino's layouts. Reviewers were more divided on the plot ambiguity, with some finding it intriguing, others finding it a little slight, and still others finding it unsatisfying, confusing, or under-developed. In an informal poll, Multiversity Comics' readers voted it the best OGN of 2022, 94% of League of Comic Geek readers liked the book with it averaging four stars, and the book has a 4.3 reader rating on Amazon.com.

Ten Thousand Black Feathers
Reviewers responding positively to Sorrentino's art, particularly praising the different art styles to separate past and present, reality and otherworldy, and dreamlike and nightmarish. The first issue in particular was praised for its intriguing hooks and characters, and later issues for their world building and character development, though with some criticism for leaning too heavily on well-worn coming-of-age tropes.

Collected editions

References

Image Comics titles
2022 comics debuts